Innichen is a municipality in South Tyrol in northern Italy.

It is located in the Puster Valley on the Drava River, on Italy's border with Austria. It hosts Italy’s International Snow Sculpture Festival each year.

Innichen is renowned for its ski resorts, and it includes the natural park of Tre Cime.

Geography

Innichen borders the municipalities of Toblach, Innervillgraten (Austria), Sexten, and Sillian (Austria).

History
Innichen is home to the Innichen Abbey, founded in the late 8th century (769) by duke Tassilo III of Bavaria, belonging to the Prince-Bishopric of Freising. The abbey itself was disestablished in 1785, while the surrounding estates were acquired by the County of Tyrol after the Mediatisation of 1803 (Reichsdeputationshauptschluss). According to the  terms of the Treaty of Saint-Germain, Innichen became part of the Kingdom of Italy in 1919. Innichen is still the site of a Franciscan monastery founded in 1691.

Coat-of-arms
The emblem shows an argent tower with the Ghibelline merlon on two levels, with the 
portal and the portcullis; above the door a coat of arms showing the head of a Moor, crowned with an or diadem on azure. The tower has settled on vert countryside and gules. This kind of representation points out that the site was once under the rule of the Bishops of Freising owners of a large area in the region from 769 to 1803. The coat of arms was granted by King Albert I of Germany in 1303.

Society

Linguistic Distribution
According to the 2011 census, 85.06% of the population spoke German, 14.64% Italian and 0.30% Ladin as their first language.

Twin towns
Innichen is twinned with:

  Freising, Germany, since 1969

Notable residents
 Daniel Glira (born 1994), ice hockey player
 Jannik Sinner (born 2001), tennis player

References

External links
 Official website 

Municipalities of South Tyrol
Ski areas and resorts in Italy